Glima was featured in the Summer Olympic Games demonstration programme in 1912.

References

Olympics
Discontinued sports at the Summer Olympics
1912 Summer Olympics events
Olympic demonstration sports